Marija Stasiulytė (born 23 March 1992) is a Lithuanian former footballer who played as a defender. She has been a member of the Lithuania women's national team.

References

1992 births
Living people
Women's association football defenders
Lithuanian women's footballers
Lithuania women's international footballers
Gintra Universitetas players